William Grimes (1784 – August 20, 1865) was an African American barber and writer who authored what is considered the first narrative of an American ex-slave, Life of William Grimes, the Runaway Slave, published in 1825, with a second edition published in 1855. Another revised edition was published by one of his descendants in 2008. Grimes escaped slavery by boarding on a ship called Casket, which sailed from Savannah, Georgia to New York City. He then walked to Connecticut from New York City in order to begin his life as a free man. Grimes lived in Stratford, Norwalk, Fairfield, Bridgeport and Stratford Point alongside New Haven and Litchfield, Connecticut following his escape from slavery. New Haven was where Grimes eventually settled in order to live out his final days.

Biography 
Grimes was born into slavery in King George County, Virginia, in 1784.  His father was Benjamin Grymes, Jr., a wealthy plantation owner; Grimes' mother was a slave on a neighboring plantation. Benjamin Grymes, Jr., the father of William Grimes was the great-grandson of William Fitzhugh. Fitzhugh was the founder of Eagles's Nest plantation located in King George County, Virginia. Benjamin Grymes, Jr., volunteered for Grayson's Continental Line Regiment in the American Revolutionary army and eventually received the rank of Lieutenant in 1777. 

During his years of slavery, Grimes was owned by at least ten different masters, in Virginia, Maryland, and Georgia.  He worked as a house servant, valet, field worker, stable boy, and coachman.  In 1815, at the age of 30, Grimes escaped from slavery by stowing away on the ship Casket that sailed from Savannah, Georgia to New York City. He then travelled by foot from New York City to New Haven, Connecticut.

Grimes settled in New Haven, Connecticut, where he was a successful barber. His clients included students from nearby Yale University and Litchfield. Grimes married Clarissa Caesar in 1817 in New Haven by Reverend Samuel Merwin. They had eighteen children together, but only twelve survived until adulthood. 

In 1820 the United States census shows that Grimes was the head of a seven-member household in Litchfield. Following this, Grimes rents his barbershop in Litchfield and moves to New Haven where he worked as a barber, grocer, and furniture merchant. It is noted that Grimes lived in many cities in Connecticut. These cities being Stratford, Norwalk, Fairfield, Bridgeport and Stratford Point alongside New Haven and Litchfield.  

In 1823, Grimes' last slave owner tracked him down and demanded he must pay for his freedom. His former slave owner would have him arrested and forced back into slavery if Grimes were to refuse.  

After living 4 years in Litchfield, Grimes moved back to New Haven. Where he lived the rest of his years.  Clarissa Caesar, his wife, then left for California because her and Grimes split some time before writing his second edition. No information is given by Grimes for why this occurred. However, he mentions that only his youngest child is still with him at that time and does not know where any other child of his is. 

Grimes was still listed as living in New Haven in the 1830 and 1840 United States census. 

Furthermore, in 1860 William Grimes is listed as the head of an eight-person household in New Haven while his occupation is shown as a lottery dealer in the United States census.

Purchasing of Freedom in Litchfield 
Grimes became a known figure in Litchfield and New Haven, Connecticut while living there. Through his multiple jobs of barbering, furniture trading and errand running for students he was able to network with students, faculty and politicians in the communities. It was this connecting with members in each community that caused Grimes' recent master to learn where Grimes was located. Feeling that the community of Litchfield was smaller and the political landscape would be more in his favor if his recent master came looking for him, Grimes moved to Litchfield. 

In 1823, Francis Harvey Welman, Grimes' last slave owner tracked him down and demanded Grimes must pay for his freedom with "my house and land, all I had," or else face arrest and re-enslavement. The following year, in April of 1824, Grimes officially purchased his freedom for 500 dollars. Grimes had to mortgage his property and take on debt in order to pay for his freedom. However, the people who he was connected and friends with in Litchfield were able to help him with his negotiation of price for his freedom. Grimes had no choice but to pay, and wrote his memoir in hopes of recovering his finances. Grimes fled New Haven to live in Litchfield, Connecticut due to his former master tracking him down.

Family 
A great-great-great-granddaughter of Grimes, Regina Mason, was an editor of the 2008 edition of Grimes' book. Mason talked about her ancestor's life in an interview with Terry Gross on the Fresh Air radio program on January 18, 2016. A 2017 film by Sean Durant entitled Gina's Journey: The Search for William Grimes documents her experiences of tracking down information about Grimes over a fifteen-year period. It includes reenactments of scenes from both Mason's and Grimes's lives with narration by Keith David.

Death 
Grimes died on August 20, 1865, about 81 years old, in New Haven, Connecticut. On his death, his obituary was published as far away as Brooklyn, New York. He was then laid to rest in Grove Street Cemetery, located near Yale University. Clarissa Caesar Grimes, his wife, died on December 15 in San Francisco. Following this, she was laid to rest in New Haven with her husband.

Slave Narratives

Life of William Grimes, the runaway slave 
William Grimes published his first slave narrative, Life of William Grimes, the runaway slave in 1825 in an effort to earn recover finances. His slave narrative provides great detail of his life until 1825. This slave narrative was published only months after he purchased his freedom. Grimes also published an updated version of his autobiography in 1855. 

Grimes felt a second publishing of his slave narrative would be best because his first edition of his slave narrative is considered the first one by many, which he felt caused him to lose out on monetary gains. The second version provides an update of his life until 1855 while also counterbalancing the bitterness put forth in his first slave narrative. However, his second release of a slave narrative did receive a much different reception from the first. In fact, the abolitionist press at the time did not make any references to the second edition in any newspapers.

See also

Fugitive slaves in the United States
Slave narrative

Notes

External links
 Text of Grimes' memoir

 
 
 

1784 births
1865 deaths
19th-century American slaves
African-American abolitionists
African-American activists
19th-century Christians
African-American Christians
African-American non-fiction writers
American non-fiction writers
African-American publishers (people)
American publishers (people)
American autobiographers
19th-century American memoirists
Writers from New Haven, Connecticut
American male journalists
19th-century American male writers
Christian abolitionists
People who wrote slave narratives
19th-century American businesspeople